The 2019 West Oxfordshire District Council election took place on 2 May 2019 to elect members of West Oxfordshire District Council in Oxfordshire, England. One third of the council was up for election and the Conservative Party stayed in overall control of the council.

After the election, the composition of the council was:

 Conservative 28
 Liberal Democrats 10
 Labour 9
 Independent 2

Election result

Ward results

References 

West Oxfordshire District Council elections
2010s in Oxfordshire
West Oxfordshire
May 2019 events in the United Kingdom